Collonista arsinoensis is a species of sea snail, a marine gastropod mollusk in the family Colloniidae<ref name="WoRMS">Bouchet, P. (2012). Collonista arsinoensis (Issel, 1869). Accessed through: World Register of Marine Species at http://www.marinespecies.org/aphia.php?p=taxdetails&id=599410 on 2012-09-27</ref>

Distribution
This species occurs in the Red Sea.

References

 Savigny, J.C., 1817 Description de l'Egypte ou recueil des observations et des recherches qui ont ete faites en Egypte pendant l'expedition de l'armée française, publié par ordre du Gouvernement. Histoire Naturelle, Planches, Tome Deuxième. Céphalopodes, pl. 1; Gastéropodes, pl. 1–3; Coquilles, pl. 1-14; Annélidés, pl. 1–5; Crustacés, pl. 1-13; Arachnidés, pl. 1–9; Myriapodes, pl 1.; Orthoptères, pl. 1–7; Nevroptères, pl. 1–3; Hyménoptères, pl. 1-20; Echinodermes, pl. 1–9; Zoophytes, pl. 1–3; Ascidies, pl. 1; Polypes, pl. 1-14; Algues, pl. 1–2, vol. 2
 Issel, A., 1869 Malacologia del mar rosso. Ricerche zoologiche e paleontologiche, p. 387 pp, pls 1–5
 Bouchet, P. & Danrigal, F., 1982. Napoleon's Egyptian campaign (1798–1801) and the Savigny collection of shells. The Nautilus 96(1): 9–24
 Vine, P. (1986). Red Sea Invertebrates.'' Immel Publishing, London. 224 pp.
 Zuschin, M., Janssen, R. & Baal, C. (2009). Gastropods and their habitats from the northern Red Sea (Egypt: Safaga). Part 1: Patellogastropoda, Vetigastropoda and Cycloneritimorpha. Annalen des Naturhistorischen Museums in Wien 111[A]: 73–158

arsinoensis
Gastropods described in 1869